The Tiger Lillies are a cult British musical trio formed in 1989 by singer-songwriter Martyn Jacques. Described as the forefathers of Brechtian Punk Cabaret, the Tiger Lillies are well known for their unique sound and style which merges "the macabre magic of pre-war Berlin with the savage edge of punk".

History
The band's name is rumoured to have been inspired by a murdered Soho sex worker called Lillie who used to dress up in animal print. Jacques, however, has stated that he named the band after a painting he had on his wall. The band formed in 1989 when Martyn Jacques placed an ad on Loot looking for a drummer and a bass player for a new band. Adrian Huge and Phil Butcher (the band's first bassist who was succeeded by Adrian Stout in 1995) were the only musicians that got in touch with him and therefore became the original Tiger Lillies' drummer and bassist respectively.

In Spring 2012 Adrian Huge decided to take a leave of absence and was replaced by drummer Mike Pickering who toured with the Tiger Lillies from 2012. In early 2015 Pickering was replaced by Jonas Golland. By late 2021 the band had recruited their current drummer, Budi Butenop.

Musical style
The Independent has described The Tiger Lillies as "a provocative and avant-garde three-piece band that combines cabaret, vaudeville, music-hall and street theatre", while Tim Arthur of Time Out has given a more evocative description: "Imagine Kurt Weill conjuring up images of prewar Berlin while a falsetto vocalist screams, squeaks and squawks his way through every number like some rambling madman, and you've got the picture".  Notorious for singing controversial songs involving bestiality, prostitution, blasphemy and all other vice imaginable, The Tiger Lillies are undoubtedly not for the easily offended.  Their musical style is mainly influenced by Bertolt Brecht and Kurt Weill's masterpiece The Threepenny Opera and pre-war Berlin cabaret but other influences such as gypsy and circus music, French chanson and British music hall tunes are also evident.

Awards and nominations
 In 2002 their cult hit musical Shockheaded Peter was nominated for five Olivier Awards. The show won the Olivier for Best Entertainment and Martyn Jacques won the Olivier for Best Supporting Performance in a Musical or Entertainment.
 In 2003 their album The Gorey End (in collaboration with the Kronos Quartet and writer, illustrator Edward Gorey) was nominated for Dominique de Rivaz's Luftbusiness (2008) a Grammy Award for Best Classical Crossover Album.
 In 2012 their show The Tiger Lillies Perform Hamlet, produced by Copenhagen's Republique Theatre and directed by acclaimed Danish director Martin Tulinius, was nominated for a Reumert Award in the category Music Theatre/Show of the Year 2012.

Members
Current
 Martyn Jacques – accordion, lead vocals, piano, guitar, harmonica, ukulele, banjolele (1989–present)
 Adrian Stout – double bass, backing vocals, jaw harp, musical saw, theremin (1995–present)
 Budi Butenop – drums, (2021–present)

Past
 Phil Butcher – bass (1989–95)
 Adrian Huge – drums (1989–2012)
 Mike Pickering – drums (2012–15)
 Jonas Golland – drums (2015–21)

Discography

Cassettes
 Bouquet of Vegetables (1989)
 Spit Bucket (1990)
 Little Death (1991)

Studio CDs

 Births, Marriages and Deaths (1994)
 Spit Bucket (1995)
 Ad Nauseam (1995)
 The Brothel to the Cemetery (1996)
 Farmyard Filth (1997)
 Low Life Lullabies (1998)
 Shockheaded Peter - A Junk Opera (1998)
 Bad Blood + Blasphemy (1999) (+ vinyl 2015)
 Circus Songs (2000)
 Two Penny Opera (2001)
 The Sea (2002)
 Punch and Judy (2004)
 Death and the Bible (2004)
 Die Weberischen (2006)
 The Little Match Girl (2006)
 Love & War (2007)
 Seven Deadly Sins (2008)

 Freakshow (2009)
 Cockatoo Prison (2010)
 Here I Am Human! (2010)
 Woyzeck (2011)
 Rime of the Ancient Mariner (2012)
 Hamlet (2012)
 Either/Or (2013)
 Lulu – A Murder Ballad (2014)
 A Dream Turns Sour (2014)
 The Story of Franz Biberkopf (2015)
 Madame Piaf (2016)
 Love for Sale - A Hymn to Heroin (2016)
 A Cold Night in Soho (2017) (+ vinyl 2017)
 Edgar Allan Poe's Haunted Palace (2017)
 The Devil's Fairground (2018)
 Corrido De La Sangre (2018)
 COVID-19 (2020, digital only)
 COVID-19, Vol. II (2020, digital only)
 Litany of Satan (2020, digital only)
 Requiem for a Virus (2021, digital only)
 A Christmas Carol (2021)
 Onepenny Opera (2022)

Soundtracks
 Variete (1925) (New music composed and played by The Tiger Lillies for the E.A. Dupont silent movie) (2015) (DVD)
 Goosebumps (2016) (CD)
 Cravendale advert: Barry the Biscuit Boy (2014)

Live CDs
 Live in Russia 2000–2001 (2003)
 Live on WFMU (2004)
 Live in Soho (2007)
 Urine Palace (with The Symphony Orchestra of Norrlandsoperan) (2007)
 Live at the New Players Theatre – London 2009 (2009)
 Lemonaki (2020)

Compilation CDs
 Bouquet of Vegetables - The Early Years (2000)
 The Tiger Lillies (2006)

DVDs
 Shockheaded Peter and Other Songs – Live in Concert in New York (2000)
 Mountains of Madness (with Alexander Hacke (Einstürzende Neubauten) and drawings by Danielle de Picciotto) (2006)
 The Tiger Lillies – The Early Years (2009)
 The Tiger Lillies Live in Prague (2011)

Collaborations CDs
 The Gorey End (with The Kronos Quartet) (2003)
 Huinya (with Группировка Ленинград) (2005)
 Sinderella - The Twisted Tale of a Christmas Crack-Whore (with Justin Bond) (2008)
 The Ballad of Sexual Dependency (with Nan Goldin) (2011)
 The Whore of Babylon (with Andréane Leclerc) (2020)

Extended play CDs
 Goodbye Great Nation (with Contrastate) (1996)
 Special Edition (2000)

Contributions / Various Artists
 Misfits (1996, Volume) - "Heroin And Cocaine"
 Torture Garden (1999) "Roll Up"
 Mixx On The Fly - Live From Studio A - WCBE Vol. 7 (2000, WCBE) - "Flying Robert"
 Fly On The Wall: Lost Tracks From Studio A (2001, WCBE) - "Snip Snip (Suck-A-Thumb)"
 Дед Мороз Против Анти Деда Мороза Bad Taste Новый Год (2002) "Drunken Sailor"
 WFMU Gone Wild! (2005, WFMU) - "Banging In The Nails" (Video Compilation)
 Kosmos 93.6FM - Ethnic Collection Vol.3 (2005, Minos EMI) - "Weeping Chandelier"
 Dimitris Papaspyropoulos presents Once Upon a Time (2005, Columbia Records) - "Russians"
 Plague Songs (2006, 4AD) - "Hailstones"
 A Sepiachord Passport (2010, Projekt) - "Roll Up"
 The Devil In Love: A Soundtrack To The 1772 Occult Novel (2011, Malort Forlag) - "I'm In Love With The Devil"
 Un-Herd Volume 62 (2017, R2 Records) - "You Wouldn't Know"

Digital release
 Mountains of Madness (with Alexander Hacke) (2020)

Books
 1998 – The Ultimate Shockheaded Peter Book – 
 2003 – Farmyard Fantasy Book – made by b7UE
 2007 – "The Tiger Lillies Book" – b7UE 02
 2007 – "The Tiger Lillies – Selected illustrations of songs" – by Anne Sophie Malmberg
 2008 – "The Inquisitorial Skeleton Shooting" – limited edition shot by b7UE

Shows and films
Shows
The Tiger Lillies have appeared in numerous shows, the following are listed according to their premiere date:

1998:  Shockheaded Peter
1998:  The Tiger Lillies Circus
2004:  Punch & Judy
2005:  The Little Matchgirl
2006:  Die Weberischen
2006:  The Mountains of Madness  with Alexander Hacke and Danielle de Picciotto
2008:  7 Deadly Sins
2008: Sinderella with Justin Bond
2009: The Tiger Lillies' Freakshow
2010: The Ballad of Sexual Dependency with Nan Goldin
2010: Cockatoo Prison
2010: Here I Am Human!
2011: Tom Waits' Rain Dogs Revisited
2011: Woyzeck & The Tiger Lillies 

2012: Rime of the Ancient Mariner
2012: The Tiger Lillies Perform Hamlet – nominated for a Reumert Performing Arts Award
2013: Either/Or Cabaret
2013: Lulu – A Murder Ballad with Opera North
2014: A Dream Turns Sour
2015: Die Geschichte vom Franz Biberkopf – Schauspiel Frankfurt
2016: Love for Sale - The Songs of Cole Porter with Opera North
2016: Madame Piaf
2017: Cold Night in Soho
2017: The Very Worst of the Tiger Lillies
2017: Edgar Allan Poe's Haunted Palace - Bergen International Festival
2018: Corrido de la Sangre
2018: The Last Days of Mankind

Films
Jake Scott's Plunkett & Macleane (1999)
Sergei Bodrov's The Quickie (2001) – a music band in celebrations.
Sergei Bodrov's Drunken Sailor (2007) – a documentary on The Tiger Lillies by the director of Oscar-nominated epic Mongol
Penny Woolcock's The Margate Exodus (2007) – a contemporary re-telling of the Book of Exodus. Martyn Jacques appears in the film as Shebeen Singer performing "Hailstones".
Dominique de Rivaz's Luftbusiness (2008)
Valdís Óskarsdóttir's Country Wedding (2008)
Troma's Lloyd Kaufman's Return To Nuke 'Em High (2013)
Andrey Proshkin's Orlean (Russian title Орлеан) (2015) – soundtrack.
E.A. Dupont's Variete (1925) (2015) – soundtrack.

References

External links 

 The Tiger Lillies Book: The complete lyrics from 1989–2007 and 340 unreleased pictures shot by b7UE
 VIDEOCLIP of "Living Hell"
 Live acoustic session in Vienna by 'They Shoot – Music Don't They'
 Pictures of the concert in St.-Petersburg (11.09.2005)
 Pictures of another concert in St.Petersburg, Russia (13.06.2007)

British comedy musical groups
Black comedy music
Dark cabaret musicians
Musical groups established in 1989